The 2020 South Carolina Gamecocks football team (variously South Carolina, USC, SC, or The Gamecocks) represented the University of South Carolina in the 2020 NCAA Division I FBS football season. The season marked the Gamecocks' 127th overall season, and 29th as a member of the SEC East Division. The Gamecocks played their home games at Williams–Brice Stadium in Columbia, South Carolina, and were led by head coach Will Muschamp until his firing on November 15. Mike Bobo (offensive coordinator & quarterbacks coach) was named interim head coach for the remainder of the season.

After compiling a 2–8 record, all in conference play, the team accepted a bid to the Gasparilla Bowl, as the NCAA had waived bowl eligibility requirements for the season. The Gamecocks were slated to play UAB, but had to withdraw on December 22 due to COVID-19 issues within the program.

Preseason

2020 recruiting class

Offseason departures

SEC Media Days
In the preseason media poll, South Carolina was predicted to finish in fifth place in the East Division.

Personnel

Coaching staff

Roster

Schedule
South Carolina had games scheduled against Clemson, Coastal Carolina, East Carolina, and Wofford, which were all canceled due to the COVID-19 pandemic. This was the first season since 1908 that the Gamecocks did not play Clemson.

Game summaries

Tennessee

at Florida

at Vanderbilt

Auburn

at LSU

Texas A&M

at Ole Miss

Missouri

Georgia

at Kentucky

Rankings

Players drafted into the NFL

References

South Carolina
South Carolina Gamecocks football seasons
South Carolina Gamecocks football